The Coulee Corridor Scenic Byway is a National Scenic Byway in the U.S. state of Washington. It has three component highways:

SR 17 from Othello to Coulee City;
US 2 in Coulee City; and
SR 155 from Coulee City to Omak

References

Washington State Scenic and Recreational Highways
U.S. Route 2
National Scenic Byways